Down on the River is a bluegrass and old-time music album by John Hartford, released in 1989.

Reception

Music critic Thom Owen, writing for Allmusic, wrote of the album "Hartford's approach may be too kitschy for some -- after all, there are several songs driven by calliope -- yet it's a thoroughly entertaining album for listeners that share his obsessions, or at least his fondness for fine, old-timey banjo."

Track listing
All songs by John Hartford.
 "Here I Am in Love Again" – 2:37
 "Bring Your Clothes Back Home" – 2:31
 "I Wish We Had Our Time Again" – 2:54
 "All I Got Is Gone Away" – 1:49
 "Delta Queen Waltz" – 3:49
 "Old Time River Man" – 3:37
 "Men All Want to Be Hoboes" – 2:38
 "Right in the Middle (Of Falling in Love)" – 3:13
 "There'll Never Be Another You" – 2:55
 "Little Boy" – 2:33
 "General Jackson" – 1:45

Personnel
John Hartford – fiddle, banjo, vocals
Mark Howard – guitar
Roy Huskey, Jr. – bass
Holly O'Dell – fiddle, vocals
Jonathan Yudkin – fiddle, vocals
Margaret Archer – vocals
Chris Ballinger – vocals
Dale Ballinger – vocals
Benny Martin – vocals
Curly Seckler – vocals

Production notes:
Jack Clement – producer
John Hartford – producer, lettering, art direction
Roger Jackson – engineer
Mark Howard – engineer, mixing
Jim McGuire – photography

References

John Hartford albums
1989 albums